Grégory Gadebois (born 24 July 1976) is a French actor.

Life and career
He studied at the CNSAD in the classroom of Catherine Hiegel and Dominique Valadié. He was a member of the Comédie-Française from 2006 to 2012.

Theatre

Filmography

References

External links

Les Archives du Spectacle

1976 births
Living people
French male film actors
People from Seine-Maritime
21st-century French male actors
French male stage actors
French male television actors
Most Promising Actor César Award winners